Kwangmyŏng Station is a closed station on Hyŏksin Line of the Pyongyang Metro. The station is reported to be closed since 1995, due to the mausoleum of Kim Il-Sung being located at that station. Trains do not stop at that station.

The station has a parking area of buses or cars in front of the station entrance.

Nearby attractions

 Kumsusan Palace of the Sun

References

Railway stations opened in 1975
Railway stations closed in 1995
Pyongyang Metro stations
1975 establishments in North Korea